Amanda Sage (born 19 April 1978) is an American painter who has studied and worked in Vienna, Austria and Los Angeles, California. She trained and worked with Ernst and Michael Fuchs, a classical artist who taught her Mischtechnik. Through Fuchs she came to know other Visionary artists with whom she has worked, exhibited and co-founded the Academy of Visionary Art in Vienna and the Colorado Alliance for Visionary Art. Sage is a lecturer, teacher, and live artist with works in international galleries and museums.

Early life
Amanda Sage was born on 19 April 1978 in Denver, Colorado. She "did a lot of drawing" as a young girl and developed an interest in art in a home that allowed for experimentation. Her mother's name, meant to symbolize universal interconnectedness, is "You"; It is her full legal name. She lived as a young girl in Deerfield Beach, Florida. Her family returned to Colorado and settled in Boulder, Colorado, where she was spent most of her formative years. Her parents were open-minded people who nurtured their daughter's spirituality, sense of fearlessness and consciousness. The family attended the Unity Church, which embraces a metaphysical interpretation of the Bible. Sage regular meditated mornings at the Unity of Boulder Spiritual Center and went on vision quests and meditative retreats.

Sage was schooled at Boulder's Shining Mountain Waldorf School. Its objective is to develop moral courage, independent thinking and artistic talents of its students in alignment with Austrian Rudolf Steiner's educational philosophy. She studied art under Hikaru Hirata-Miyakawa who introduced her to "semi-realism" and the works of Ernst Fuchs. She developed an interest in painting with acrylics. Hirata-Miyakawa describes Sage as a serious, yet playful student who was a quick-learner. She graduated in 1996.

Art

Studies and early career
In Vienna, Austria, she studied the Mischtechnik techniques of the Old Masters for two years under Michael Fuchs. He taught her to study and realistically represent nature. Sage studied under and worked for Ernst Fuchs, Michael's father, starting in 1999. It was a working relationship that spanned ten years and provided opportunities to expand her interest in Visionary art. For five summers she worked on Fuchs' lifetime project in the Apocalypse Chapel in Klagenfurt, Austria. She taught "underpainting" at Phil Rubinov-Jacobson's 1999 and 2000 "Old Master, New Visions" in Payerbach, Austria. Rubinov-Jacobson was one of Ernst Fuchs' students in the 1970s. Sage obtained studio space in 2000 in the Viennese WUK cultural center, an artists' collective and cultural center, where she organized cultural events and was a board member.

Sage traveled to Bali in 2006 for an artistic vision quest, in which she only carried paint, brushes and a roll of canvas. The purpose of the two-month trip was to develop greater inner awareness and expand her capabilities as a transformative, visionary artist. She made Dreams while in Bali, which introduced the egg motif used in many of her subsequent paintings.

Career
She began to exhibit in the United States with other visionary artists and venues beginning in 2007. That year she began to be represented by Galerie 10, who also represented Ernst Fuchs, Manfred Deix, Rudolf Hausner,  Helmut Kand, Anton Lehmden, Arik Brauer, and Wolfgang Hutter. Sage moved to Los Angeles, California, where her works were exhibited at the Temple of Visions gallery.

Sage has painted live, conducted workshops and delivered lectures at exhibitions and transformational festivals, like Inner Visions at the Boom Festival in Portugal, Palenque Norte's Burning Man, Harmonic Spaces in Australia, Art Basel Miami, and The Nexus Global Youth Summit. Her works are in galleries and salons worldwide, including Vienna, Australia and Italy. In the United States, her works have been shown in Los Angeles, Chicago and Colorado.

Visionary art organizations
Sage is one of ten members of the Visionary Guild that studied under Fuchs. The guild is part of the Vienna Academy of Visionary Art that opened in September 2013, the idea of which was conceived by Sage and done in concert with Laurence Caruana and A. Andrew Gonzalez. She met both men in 2000 when working with Ernst Fuchs. Vienna was a desired locale because of the influence of the Vienna School of Fantastic Realism. The academy is located near Ernst Fuchs' studio, the Palais Pálffy and Phantasten Museum, which has some of Sage's works. Her Spring 2014 seminar at the academy is entitled "Free Your Expression" and covers marketing, exhibition processes, artistic collaboration and live painting.

Two other guild members, David Heskin and his wife Aloria Weaver, and Sage founded the Colorado Alliance of Visionary Artists (CAVA). Heskin, Weaver, Sage, Caruana and Hikaru Hirata-Miyakawa participated in the Symposium on Visionary Art & Culture and made live paintings in Boulder on May 23, 2013.

Style, themes and methods
She is considered a talented visionary artist. Her portrait and figure-works are meant to inspire spiritual and personal transformation. They feature waves of "intense color" that convey boundless growth opportunities.

She receives inspiration from live music and her own ideas or emotions. She begins painting by nurturing and allowing a story to develop. She uses devices, such as playing music or audiobooks, to allow herself to freely and spontaneously let the painting emerge without overthinking. When she paints live, Sage often receives a nugget from a conversation as inspiration for her work.

She sees visionary art as a cultural phenomenon and an art form that tells a universal story of interconnectedness of life and the divine. Believing that "art is a powerful, symbolic language," transformation is the ultimate goal to entice awareness and actions to consciously care for one another and the earth. Personally, "it's a practice, a meditation, and a dedication that takes me into a space of contemplation."

The egg is a common motif in her works. It represents the seed of life and a doorway or portal to the infinite. Sage has said that it is her intention "to create portals that open to the infinite possibilities of being and expressing, so that we may remember and re-discover who we are, where we originate from and where we are headed." Another symbolic reference is "the train" meant to convey regenerative, infinite journeys to bring about spiritual, educational, creative and practical transformation. The work, Regeneration, made in 2012, is one of her favorite paintings: "It encompasses a very simple vision and scenario on which to meditate... It is the journey of regeneration, activation, collaboration, and participation – rooted in compassion, forgiveness, and love."

Notes

References

Further reading

External links
Official Website

1978 births
Living people
Fantastic realism
American women painters
Psychedelic artists
Visionary artists
American contemporary painters
Waldorf school alumni
Painters from Colorado
20th-century American painters
20th-century American women artists
21st-century American women artists